Ramón Cid Pardo (born 15 August 1954 in San Sebastián) is a retired Spanish triple jumper. His personal best jump was 16.69 metres, achieved in October 1980 in Madrid. He competed in the men's triple jump at the 1976 Summer Olympics and the 1980 Summer Olympics.

International competitions

References

1954 births
Living people
Spanish male triple jumpers
Athletes (track and field) at the 1976 Summer Olympics
Athletes (track and field) at the 1980 Summer Olympics
Olympic athletes of Spain
Athletes (track and field) at the 1975 Mediterranean Games
Mediterranean Games competitors for Spain